The Piglet Files is a British sitcom produced by London Weekend Television (LWT). The show consisted of three series totalling 21 episodes that ran between 7 September 1990 and 10 May 1992.

The programme follows the life of reluctant MI5 agent Peter "Piglet" Chapman as he tries to instruct his fellow agents on the finer points of spy gadgetry while keeping his wife Sarah in the dark about his new career.

Plot
In the early 1990s, during the intervening period between the fall of the Berlin Wall and the collapse of the Soviet Union, MI5 combats the Soviet spies within the United Kingdom while facing their own agents' ineptitude, and the ridicule of the sheer fact that the Soviet Union is no longer a threat; but MI5 knows better and indeed the Soviets are intent on making trouble.

In an effort to alleviate their agents' incompetence, MI5 hires local university teacher Peter Chapman, convincing him by getting him sacked from the university, which leaves him no choice. His new bosses, Maurice Drummond and Andrew Maxwell, assign him to the technology division, and he insists on having a codename, to further his identity in the world of spying. The first codenames listed were Panda, then Panther, but those are already in use, they then incorrectly stated that Puma was the next available name before correcting themselves and assigning Peter the next name..."Piglet." Piglet routinely joins the other field agents on missions—mainly to ensure that MI5 gets its equipment back.

Peter "Piglet" Chapman must now face down Soviet assassins and double agents while keeping his identity as an MI5 technician secret from everyone else, including his wife Sarah.

Characters
Peter "Piglet" Chapman –  Nicholas Lyndhurst
Major Maurice Drummond – Clive Francis
Major Andrew Maxwell – John Ringham
Dexter – Michael Percival
Sarah Chapman – Serena Evans
Flint – Louise Catt
Lewis – Steven Law
Trueman – Paul Cooper

Series overview

Episodes

Series 1 (1990)

Series 2 (1991)

Series 3 (1992)

DVD release
All three series of The Piglet Files are available on DVD, through Network.

External links

1990s British sitcoms
1990 British television series debuts
1992 British television series endings
English-language television shows
ITV sitcoms
London Weekend Television shows
MI5 in fiction
Television series by ITV Studios